Margaropus is a genus of ticks, characterized as inornate, having eyes, lacking festoons, and with the legs of the male increasing in size from pair I to IV with the segments enlarged, giving them a beaded appearance, from which the genus name was taken, margaritopus signifying beady-legged; the species name memorialized naturalist and entomologist Wilhelm von Winthem.

The genus currently includes three species:
Margaropus reidi, Hoogstraal, 1956, the Sudanese beady-legged tick
Margaropus wileyi, Walker & Laurence, 1973, the East African giraffe tick
Margaropus winthemi, Karsch, 1879, the South African winter horse tick or beady-legged tick

In their native range, Margaropus species ticks parasitize larger land animals, including the three largest southern African wild ruminants, giraffes, Giraffa camelopardalis; African buffaloes, Syncerus caffer; and common eland, Taurotragus oryx.

See also
Photos of Margaropus winthemi

References

Ticks
Ixodidae